Lawrence Harrison may refer to:

Lawrence Harrison (academic) (1932–2015), American scholar known for his work on international development
Pops Harrison (Lawrence C. Harrison, 1906–1967), American college basketball coach
Lawrence Harrison (Canadian football) in 1977 CFL Draft

See also
Larry Harrison (disambiguation)